Flexform SpA is an Italian company with its head office in Meda, Italy, at the centre of the furniture production district of La Brianza. Founded in 1959 by the Galimberti brothers, the company designs, produces and markets furniture and furnishing accessories for residential and public use.

History
In the early 20th century the Galimberti family opened an artisan workshop to build armchairs and sofas. In 1959 brothers Romeo, Pietro and Agostino Galimberti decided to call the activity Flexform di Galimberti, marketing their products in the local area.

In 1967 it became a public limited company and was transformed from an artisan workshop into an industrial firm. Collaborations began with Italian architects and creatives, many of whom destined to become the protagonists of Italian design.

In 1969 Flexform entrusted the study of the brand to Pino Tovaglia, the graphic designer who designed the Pirelli brand in the same years, while designer Joe Colombo created the Tube Chair armchair, which was subsequently exhibited in the permanent collection of the Museum of Modern Art (MoMA) in New York.

From the 1970s Flexform began to export abroad. Participating in the Cologne Furniture Fair in Germany, it made its name on the markets of Northern Europe. There followed years of economic expansion in Europe, which prompted the second generation of the Galimberti family to broaden its commercial horizons to the countries across the ocean. With the entry of the third generation, in the late 1990s exports were consolidated to Brazil, Russia, China, the USA and the countries of the Far and Middle East.

In the meantime the need grew to further diversify the offer to satisfy the tastes of the emerging markets. So 2001 saw the launch of Flexform Mood, a new collection of products with an international and retro style, initially coordinated by US designer John Hutton.

Flexform has remained a family company. It has 135 employees and a plant covering an area of 30,000 square metres. All production continues to take place exclusively in Italy, in Meda, to keep the product Made in Italy, as it originally was

Designers
Over the years, designers and architects including the following have been involved in the study of new products: Asnago-Vender, Sergio Asti, Cini Boeri, Joe Colombo, Paolo Nava, Rodolfo Bonetto, Carlo Colombo, Gigi Radice and Giulio Manzoni. Over 40 years the entire collection has been coordinated by architect Antonio Citterio.  2016 introduces the Adagio sofa designed by Daniel Libeskind.

Award 
A.B.C.D. armchair designed by Antonio Citterio has been awarded by Associazione per il disegno industriale with Honorable Mention XXIV Compasso D’oro ADI XXIV Compasso d'Oro (2016): i vincitori

Bibliography 
 Giovanni Albera, Nicolas Monti, Italian modern: a design heritage Rizzoli, 
 Nally Bellati, New Italian design, Rizzoli, 
 Giampiero Bosoni, Italian Design, Museum of Modern Art, 
 Andrea Branzi, Design italiano, 1964-1990, Electa, .
 Andrea Branzi, Introduzione al design italiano: una modernità incompleta, Baldini Castoldi Dalai,  
 Juli Capella, Quim Larrea, Designed by architects in the 1980s, Ed. Rizzoli - 
 Giulio Castelli, Paola Antonelli, Francesca Picchi, La fabbrica del design: conversazioni con i protagonisti del design italiano, Skira 
 Charlotte e Peter Fiell, 1000 Chairs, Taschen 
 Laura Lazzaroni, 35 anni di design al Salone del Mobile, Cosmit
 Mario Mastropietro, Rolando Gorla, Un'industria per il design, Lybra immagine, 
 Sergio Campo dall'Orto, Imprese eccellenti. Le aziende milanesi che non temono la crisi, Franco Angeli 
 Massimo Pitis; Cristina Dell'edera, Pino Tovaglia. La regola che corregge l'emozione, Edizioni Corriani
 Jim Postell, Furniture Design, John Wiley & Sons, 
 Maria Cristina Tommasini, Mario Pancera, Il design italiano: protagonisti, opere, scuole, Editoriale G. Mondadori 
 Antonio Marazza, Stefania Saviolo, Lifestyle brand: Le marche che ispirano la nostra vita, Ed. Rizzoli Etas - 
 Alberto Bassi, Antonio Citterio: industrial designer, Ed. Electa Architecture  - 
 Bernd Polster, Claudia Neumann, Markust Schuler, Frederick Leven, The A-Z of modern design, Ed. Merrell
 Pippo Ciorra, Antonio Citterio, Terry Dwan, Antonio Citterio, Terry Dwan: ten years of architecture and design - Ed. Birkhäuser Verlag - 
 Silvana Annicchiarico, Andrea Branzi, Barbara McGilvray, John Venerella, Che cosa è il design italiano? : le sette ossessioni del design italiano,  Ed. Triennale Electa - 
 Carlo Ducci, Luxury in living, Ed. Electa - 
 Mel Byars, Terence Riley, The design encyclopedia, London King,

See also 

List of Italian companies

References

External links
 Flexform website

Furniture companies of Italy
Luxury brands
Modernism
Design companies established in 1959
Manufacturing companies established in 1959
Italian companies established in 1959
Italian brands